Living Travelz is an Indian food and travel television channel based in Mumbai, Maharashtra, India. It is a part of the Living Entertainment brand of channels, which is owned by Zee Entertainment Enterprises. Programs are hosted  by chefs and anchors like Ranveer Brar, Kunal Kapur, Maria Goretti and Pankaj Bhadouria.

Programming
 Ranveer's Cafe: Ranveer Brar showcases international recipes with an Indian twist along with live musical performances by guests.
 Chef on Wheels: Gautam Mehrishi goes on road trips to find out where fruits and vegetables originate.
 Pickle Nation: Kunal Kapur travels across India chronicling the different kinds of pickles and their preparation methods.
 Food Xpress: TV anchors Rocky and Mayur go on a culinary journey around India.
 Kitchen Magic: Mehrishi experiments with common recipes and shares techniques that can be used at home.
 I Love Cooking: Maria Goretti gives her own touch to traditional recipes and dishes.
 The Great Indian Rasoi: Brar features long lost recipes and hidden secrets in traditional Indian kitchens.
 Vickypedia – Vicky Ratnani presents international.

References

Zee Entertainment Enterprises
Essel Group
Indian cuisine
Food and drink television
Television channels and stations established in 2018